Ecnomolaus clivinoides is a species of beetle in the family Carabidae, the only species in the genus Ecnomolaus.

References

Pterostichinae